Thomas Dunlap School is a historic former school building located in the Haddington neighborhood of Philadelphia, Pennsylvania. It was built in 1906, and is a three-story, nine bay by two bay, ashlar stone building in the Colonial Revival-style. It features a projecting, center cross gable bay, paired pilasters flanking the main entrance, and a modillioned copper cornice.

The building was added to the National Register of Historic Places in 1986. It is currently in use as apartments.

References

School buildings on the National Register of Historic Places in Philadelphia
Colonial Revival architecture in Pennsylvania
School buildings completed in 1906
West Philadelphia
1906 establishments in Pennsylvania